Stephane Acka (born 11 October 1990) is an Ivorian footballer who plays as a defender. In his career Acka played in Italy, Romania and Turkey.

Personal life
Stephane Acka grew up in Verona, Italy and spent his football formation years in the Hellas Verona youth academy. His brother Lorenzo is also a footballer, who played in the lower leagues of Italy and Romania. They played against each other in a CSM Reșița against Universitatea Craiova game in the sixteenths-finals phase of the 2019–20 Cupa României, which ended with a 1–0 win for Universitatea. Stephane Acka speaks five languages, namely, Italian, Portuguese, Romanian, French and English.

Honours
Universitatea Craiova
Cupa României: 2020–21

References

External links
 
 
 
 
 

1990 births
Living people
Footballers from Abidjan
Ivorian footballers
Association football defenders
A.C. Belluno 1905 players
FC U Craiova 1948 players
CS Universitatea Craiova players
Büyükşehir Belediye Erzurumspor footballers
Hapoel Ironi Kiryat Shmona F.C. players
Sektzia Ness Ziona F.C. players
Liga I players
Liga II players
Süper Lig players
TFF First League players
Israeli Premier League players
Ivorian expatriate footballers
Expatriate footballers in Italy
Expatriate footballers in Romania
Expatriate footballers in Turkey
Expatriate footballers in Israel
Ivorian expatriate sportspeople in Italy
Ivorian expatriate sportspeople in Romania
Ivorian expatriate sportspeople in Turkey
Ivorian expatriate sportspeople in Israel